The following list of marine aquarium fish species commonly available in the aquarium trade is not a completely comprehensive list; certain rare specimens may be available commercially but not yet listed here. A brief section on each, with a link to the page about the particular species is provided along with references for further information.

Angelfish (large)

These large fish are considered to be quite hardy, but because of their size may present a significant challenge to the keeper. They need huge aquariums, up to 180 gallons to house one for its entire lifespan. Two angels might be kept in the same aquarium provided it is a large aquarium, they are properly acclimated as juveniles, and they have very different colouring and body shape. However, because all Angelfish have essentially the same diet, mixing them is a feat that should be left to only advanced keepers. Most are not reef safe, and a potential owner should be aware that they need to have plenty of vegetable matter in their diet. They undergo major changes in colouration while maturing, and unless specified given descriptions are for adult specimens.

Angelfish (dwarf)

Although Dwarf Angelfish are smaller and generally more manageable than their larger counterparts, they still have some specific care requirements. They are omnivores, but plenty of vegetable matter, preferably in the form of macroalgae, should be provided for their grazing pleasure. Their suitability for reef tanks is hotly debated, so add at your own risk. Specimens that have been successfully maintained in reef aquaria include the Flame and Coral Beauty angels. However, for obvious reasons they should not be put into tanks with expensive decorative macroalgae.

Anthias

Although Anthias resemble damsels in shape and size, the two should never be confused. Anthias (also known as "fairy basslets") are finicky and many starve to death in captivity. In the wild, they eat zooplankton, and will not accept anything else in the aquarium. They also need to be fed nearly constantly, three times a day at least. The best way to ensure the health and longevity of an Anthias is to attach a refugium where copepods can be grown to "drip" into the display tank. Unlike many other saltwater aquarium inhabitants, they can be kept in groups.

Bass and groupers

In this exceedingly large group of fish, few are considered proper aquarium inhabitants, for various reasons including diet and size. Basses vary greatly from species to species. Appropriate research should be done before purchasing a specimen. Many unsuspecting hobbyists bring home cute little specimens of popular aquarium fish such as the lyretail grouper, only to realize several months later that they do not have the resources to care for a meter-long that may cost hundreds of dollars a month to feed.

Basslets and assessors

Basslets and Assessors are small, long bodied fish strongly resembling Anthias. Their care requirements, however, are closer to those of damsels. They should be kept individually, and generally not with other fish of similar shape and colour. Feeding is easy: they will generally eat any meaty foods offered. Good water quality should be maintained at all times.

Batfish

Batfish are gorgeous and striking fish that are not common in aquaria for one major reason: they get huge. A two or three hundred gallon tank is needed for one, minimum, and larger is better. They start out as tiny, manageable-looking cuties, which often fools aquarists into purchasing them for their small aquariums. However they quickly grow to gargantuan proportions, and require large amounts of food as well as space, so beware. They are not reef safe and should be fed plenty of large meaty foods.
Batfish change greatly as they grow, however the potential aquarist is most likely to see them in their juvenile form, so that is the description of the colouration here. They all have generally the same body shape: disk-like with tall dorsal and anal fins, similar to a Freshwater Angelfish.

Blennies and engineer gobies

Blennies are popular aquarium fish, and for good reason. Most of them are peaceful to other fish, while very aggressive to other blennies which has a similar shape. Some blennies are colorful, and many are downright helpful. For example, the aptly named Lawnmower Blenny will keep your green algae well trimmed and presentable. With the exception of Fang Blennies, Blennies are totally reef safe- in fact a reef environment is really best for them because they can be shy and the intricate rockwork of a reef provides ample hiding spaces. They are omnivores and should be fed a varied diet of frozen or live foods and plant matter. Blennies do not have teeth or functional jaw, so food must be small enough for them to swallow whole.
Blennies are often confused with Gobies, but there is an easy way to tell the difference. Gobies have two distinct dorsal fins, Blennies have a single dorsal fin that runs the length of their body. Also, Gobies' pelvic fins are fused to form a sucker, similar to Remoras.

The engineer goby is a close relative of cichlids and leaf fishes, the juvenile can often be found in aquarium trade, while the adult is rare.

Boxfish and blowfish

Members of the family Tetraodontidae, Boxfish, Blowfish or Pufferfish and their cousins Cowfishes and Porcupinefishes can be very personable and quirky pets, for the prepared. 
They are not thought of as an ordinary aquarium tank mate, but are quickly gaining popularity. They do pose a hazard in the community tank however. They are capable of releasing a very powerful toxin which can kill other fish and in some cases, the boxfish itself. They generally only use it when threatened or dying, but can become disturbed easily with aggressive tank mates or overcrowded aquarium. Generally they are reef safe, though they will pick at invertebrates if not fed well enough. 
Many people think puffed up Pufferfish, like in the picture, are cute, but an owner should never subject their pet to this as they are often unable to expel the air should they be out of the water. To prevent this, never remove a puffer from the water.

Butterflyfish

When properly cared for, Butterflyfish can make beautiful and distinctive additions to fish only marine aquariums. Specimens often grow to large sizes and are not well suited to smaller aquariums. Butterflyfish can be fussy and overparticular, but when fed a varied diet and kept in pristine conditions they will usually thrive. Some species in this family do not do well in captivity, and potential keepers must take care to purchase only those species that have a fighting chance. When selecting Butterflyfish especially, specimens presenting any sign or signs of mishandling are to be avoided.

The following species are relatively hardy and experienced aquarists should have no trouble with them, so long as they are diligent.

Cardinalfish

One of the few groups of shoaling fish commonly available to marine aquarists, Cardinalfish are nocturnal and tend to be quite shy. They require meaty foods and will often not take prepared foods such as flakes and tablets. For the best chance of success, keep a wide variety of frozen foods on hand. In the event of a hunger strike, they will almost always take adult brine shrimp. As far as other care requirements they are similar to damsels: not picky. So long as they are properly acclimated, they tolerate a wide range of parameters. A marine aquarist should watch the ammonia/nitrite levels of the environment, as cardinalfish are particularly sensitive to these chemicals.

Chromis

Chromis are perhaps the ultimate reef fish. Generally peaceful, most species are easy to take care of and quite colorful. Like anthias, they will school, but in many cases this tendency disappears as they age. They are, nevertheless, at least ambivalent with their own species, as well as completely reef safe. Like Damsels and Anemonefish, their close cousins, Chromis are omnivores and will accept most foods offered. A flake staple is usually sufficient, but for best color and health supplement with frozen and live foods when possible.

Clownfish

Clownfish, more technically known as Anemonefish, are the classic aquarium fish. Both hardy and attractive, they are perhaps best known for their symbiotic relationship with Sea Anemones, a relative of coral. In the wild, Anemonefish are always found with a host, leading many potential keepers to believe that an anemone is necessary to keep them. Anemonefish are easy to keep, but their cnidarian counterparts are inordinately finicky and need high light levels, and luckily Anemonefish will thrive without them. Aquarists often find that Anemonefish will host in other things, from corals and Feather Duster Worms to powerheads and other equipment.
Anemonefish care is identical to that of Damselfish, as they are actually very closely related.

Damselfish

All Damselfish can be considered reef-safe, sometimes excluding larger, more aggressive Dascyllus varieties. Some Damselfish will host in anemones like clownfish. Most Damselfish are aggressive and difficult to catch once you put them in an aquarium.

Damselfish change gender as they grow larger and older. Small damselfish are ungendered. Eventually, they become males if no males prevent them from doing so. One or sometimes two males live with a female and guard over the eggs. Females are the largest fish and dominant over the males and juveniles. They will not allow other females into an area they have claimed as their territory without a fight. They may not allow new males or juveniles, either. Aggression increases with each change.

Dartfish 

Most should be kept as pairs or small groups where all individuals are added at once.

Dragonets

Dragonets are often mis-categorized as gobies or blennies by fish sellers. They are bottom-dwelling fish that constantly hunt tiny invertebrates for food. Most starve to death in a marine aquarium unless you provide a refugium or place for the invertebrates to reproduce safely without any fish being able to reach them.

Eels

Most eels are easily kept in a large aquarium, although several species such as the blue ribbon eel should usually be avoided. With any moray eel care must be taken to secure the lid as one of the most common causes of death is escaping from the tank, and onto the floor.

Filefish

Less often kept than their relatives the triggerfish and puffers, there are many filefish that make good aquarium residents, and a few that require specialized diets, making it hard to sustain them in an aquarium.

Flatfish

Frogfish

A type of Anglerfish, Frogfish are ambush predators with huge mouths. They are capable of eating fish up to twice their length so care should be taken in choosing tank mates.

Goatfish 

While not as common a choice for aquariums as many other species, they are typically hardy and brightly colored

Gobies and clingfishes

Are typically hardy and do not harm invertebrates which makes them a good choice of fish for a reef tank.

Grunts

Hamlet

Hawkfish

Attractive and relatively small, Hawkfish make excellent additions to fish only or FOWLR aquariums. With extreme caution taken, they could be kept in reef aquariums, but because of their propensity to eat small ornamental shrimps and other mobile invertebrates (usually leaving sessile invertebrates alone) they are not considered reef safe. Lacking a swim bladder, Hawkfish can often be found resting in crevices of rocks or among the branches of corals or gorgonians. Hawkfish are easy to care for and not picky at all about water quality. A varied diet, including spirulina and small meaty foods like Mysis is recommended.

Hogfish

Idols

Jacks

Jawfish

Jawfish are burrowers and require a sandy substrate of sufficient depth.

Lionfish

"Lionfish" specifically refer to the genus Pterois within the family Scorpaenidae.  They have venomous spines and should be treated with caution. Other species within Scorpaenidae but outside Pterois may also have "lionfish" in their common names. Feeder goldfish are not the proper nutrition for a lion fish.

Parrotfish

Pipefish

Pipefish are relatives of seahorses and require a similar level of care. They should only be bought by experienced aquarium owners. Captive bred specimens are sometimes available, and are significantly more likely to survive.

Pseudochromidae

Usually only a single specimen can be kept in an aquarium. Sometimes multiple specimens can be kept in larger aquariums, but usually this requires them to be added at the same time or they will be too territorial.

Rabbitfish and Foxfaces

Less commonly kept than some other species, many still make hardy and colorful aquarium residents.

Rays

Most rays have a venomous spine near the base of the tail. Care must be taken to avoid this animal when performing tank maintenance and during capture.

Scorpionfish 

Because they are relatively inactive fishes, most species can be kept in smaller aquariums than other equally large fish, and 30 gallon tanks are not unusual. Because they are capable of eating fish that are surprisingly large, but will often be picked at by fish that eat invertebrates a species tank is often set up for them. Some fish will never accept anything but live food, typically these specimens are fed on gut packed guppies, mollies, or ghost shrimp. Similarly to the lionfish, care should be taken when handling these fish as they are also venomous.

Seahorses

It takes a special aquarist to maintain these delicate beauties. A potential keeper must be dedicated and willing to throw artistic creativity to the winds- as what seahorses need is not always beautiful. They require taller tanks, live/frozen food, and many hitching posts, as well as very peaceful tankmates. In fact, beginners would be well-advised not to mix seahorses with any other species until they have more experience. Good tank mates would include other peaceful, microfauna consuming species such as pipefish and dragonets.
Seahorses found in stores are generally Captive Bred, but occasionally one might find a wild caught (WC) specimen. WC Seahorses should only be purchased by seahorse experts who are going to breed them, as they tend to be finicky and most are endangered in the wild. 
One of the advantages of Seahorses is that many species stay small and can (in fact, some should) be kept in smaller tanks, making them ideal for aquarists who are pressed for space or money.

Seahorses are among the few popular marine aquarium species that can be temperate. Species vary in their temperature requirement, so here an extra category has been added.
TR=Tropical ST=Sub-Tropical TM=Temperate

Squirrelfish

Typically are hardy fish that can be kept with a wide variety of tankmates.

Sharks

Many sharks will outgrow most home aquariums and/or adapt poorly to captivity. However, numerous coastal and coral reef sharks do well in good aquarium surroundings although you should have experience in keeping other saltwater fish before trying to keep sharks as they are more difficult to care for. In a shark aquarium setup (preferably an oval-shaped tank for more active species), there should be much surface area (wide and long tanks with good gas exchange/more room for biological filtration and room for sharks to swim, glide, and turn with little constraint opposed to tall, thin tanks), fine substrate (coarse substrate can irritate the shark's underside), little décor and rockwork (which should be secure) for swimming space (sharks in the orders Orectolobiformes and Heterodontiformes however, feel more secure in tanks with caves and ledges), excellent filtration (sharks are messy eaters and need good water conditions), protected heaters, filter intakes, etc. by surrounding them in polyurethane foam barriers (unprotected equipment can be dangerous to active sharks), and a secure canopy (sharks can jump out of the water) as well as, strong, steady, linear water flow (10+ x the volume of the aquarium per hour) moving in a gyre circling the aquarium, dissolved oxygen levels of 7-8ppm (slightly more if you are using ozone), low light levels, and no stray electrical currents/amounts of metal in the aquarium water. Many sharks feed on invertebrates to a great degree along with fish (even ones that are larger than themselves), and although they don't eat coral, they can knock them over and rest on them. There are also many fish and invertebrates that can harm/irritate sharks such as Scorpionfish, Butterflyfish, Angelfish (large), Filefish, Triggerfish, Pufferfish, Suckerfish (over time), Porcupinefish, certain other sharks, large crabs, Hermit crabs, sea anemones, and stinging corals. Also, sharks need iodine which can be provided through regular water changes or supplements for sharks (iodine deficiencies and possibly the buildup of nitrates can result in goiter), and feeding frequency is species-specific. Copper treatments should not be administered to most shark species.

Snappers

Tangs

Tangs generally feed on algae, though there are a few carnivorous species. Most tangs will not tolerate other fish the same color and/or shape as them. They have a spine on their tails that can cut open other fish and unprotected hands. All tangs should be given plenty of swimming room; try to have at least a 4' tank. Contrary to popular belief they will tolerate smaller (4' to 5') tanks just fine but tend to live better in larger tanks, over 5'.

Tilefish

Though often categorized as gobies, tilefish are a separate species.

Triggerfish

While they are generally considered monsters that will chomp invertebrates, a few species can make great reef fish. Other more aggressive species such as the undulated trigger, and clown trigger will sometimes be so aggressive that it is necessary to keep as the sole inhabitant of the aquarium. All will require large tanks, with good filtration.

Wrasse

A diverse group of fish with an equally wide range of characteristics. Some wrasse species are aggressive towards small fish and invertebrates, others are reef safe. Some are quite hardy, some typically die within weeks.

See also 

 List of fish common names
 List of marine aquarium invertebrate species
 List of marine aquarium plant species
 List of aquarium fish by scientific name
 List of freshwater aquarium fish species
 List of brackish aquarium fish species

References 

Fishkeeping
Lists of fishes
Marine fish